Fosterville may refer to:

Fosterville, a neighborhood in Youngstown, Ohio
Fosterville, New Brunswick, a Canadian rural community in York County
Fosterville, Tennessee, an unincorporated community in Rutherford County
Fosterville, Texas, an unincorporated community in Anderson County
Fosterville, Victoria, a rural locality in the City of Greater Bendigo, Victoria
Fosterville, West Virginia, an unincorporated community in Boone County